Mazahir Amir Khan is a Pakistani politician who had been a Member of the Provincial Assembly of Sindh, from May 2013 to May 2018.

Early life and education
He was born on 11 November 1971 in Karachi.

He has a degree of Bachelors of Arts from the Allama Iqbal Open University.

Political career

He was elected to the Provincial Assembly of Sindh as a candidate of Mutahida Quami Movement from Constituency PS-96 KARACHI-VIII in 2013 Pakistani general election.

References

Living people
Sindh MPAs 2013–2018
1971 births
Muttahida Qaumi Movement politicians
Muhajir people